Lake Lynn or Lynn Lake may refer to:
 Lake Lynn, Pennsylvania
 Lake Lynn (Cabarrus County, North Carolina)
 Lake Lynn (Raleigh, North Carolina)
 Lynn Lake, Manitoba
 Lynn Lake (South Dakota)

See also
 Lyn-Lake, a street intersection in Minneapolis